Asim Abbasi is a British-Pakistani film director, screenwriter and producer. He also has his own production company, Indus Talkies.

Career

In 2012, he made the short film Anathema. In 2013, he made two more short films, Once A Man & Whore. Two years later, he made his fourth short film named Little Red Roses. All four were shot in the United Kingdom.

In 2018, Abbasi's first feature film, Cake, was lauded by critics. The Guardian's Mike McCahill wrote "Uncommonly alert to small, telling details, while more expansive in its attitudes, the result proves far richer and worldlier than anything previously observed coming down the Khyber Pass." Cake was also selected to be Pakistan's submission to the 91st Academy Awards for best Foreign Language Film.

In 2020, Abbasi further established himself as a writer & director with his critically acclaimed webseries, Churails (witches), which was hailed as a radically progressive shift from the mainstream narrative of Pakistani television.

Filmography

Films

Web series

Awards and nominations

References

External links
 
 

Film directors from Karachi
Living people
Year of birth missing (living people)